Khawaja Muhammad Nizam-ul-Mehmood is a Pakistani politician who was a Member of the Provincial Assembly of the Punjab, from May 2013 to May 2018.

Early life and education
He was born on 5 January 1975 in Dera Ghazi Khan.

He graduated in 2008 from Bahauddin Zakariya University and has a degree of Bachelor of Arts.

Political career

He was elected to the Provincial Assembly of the Punjab as a candidate of Pakistan Peoples Party from Constituency PP-241 (Dera Ghazi Khan-II) in 2013 Pakistani general election.

References

Living people
1975 births
Punjab MPAs 2013–2018
Pakistan People's Party MPAs (Punjab)